Liu Hongwu (born December 1966) is a former Chinese politician who spent his entire career in southwest China's Guangxi Zhuang Autonomous Region. He was investigated by China's top anti-graft agency in January 2022. Previously he served as vice chairman of Guangxi Zhuang Autonomous Region. Liu is the third vice-ministerial level official to be targeted by China's top anticorruption watchdog in 2022, after Zhang Yongze and Wang Bin. He is so far the second ministerial-level official from Guangxi caught since the 19th National Congress of the Chinese Communist Party in 2017, behind Liu Jun. He is a delegate to the 13th National People's Congress.

Biography
Liu was born in Changyang Tujia Autonomous County, Hubei, in December 1966, the year the Cultural Revolution broke out. In 1985, he was accepted to Wuhan University of Surveying and Mapping Science and Technology (now Wuhan University), majoring in photogrammetry and remote sensing. After university in 1989, he was despatched to the Central South Electric Power Design Institute of Ministry of Energy as a technician.

Liu got involved in politics in June 1993, when he became an official in the Beihai Land Bureau in southwest China's Guangxi Zhuang Autonomous Region. He was vice mayor of Beihai in October 2006 and vice mayor of Hezhou in August 2013. In February 2016, he became deputy director of the Development and Reform Commission of Guangxi Zhuang Autonomous Region, rising to director in February 2018. In July 2020, he rose to become vice chairman of Guangxi Zhuang Autonomous Region, a position at vice-ministerial level.

Downfall
On 14 January 2022, Liu was put under investigation for alleged "serious violations of discipline and laws" by the Central Commission for Discipline Inspection (CCDI), the party's internal disciplinary body, and the National Supervisory Commission, the highest anti-corruption agency of China. On June 23, he was expelled from the Chinese Communist Party (CCP) and dismissed from public office. On July 13, prosecutors signed an arrest order for him.

References

1966 births
Living people
People from Changyang Tujia Autonomous County
Wuhan University alumni
Cheung Kong Graduate School of Business alumni
Central Party School of the Chinese Communist Party alumni
People's Republic of China politicians from Hubei
Chinese Communist Party politicians from Hubei
Delegates to the 13th National People's Congress